Sarah Shields was Arkansas’ first female lawyer. She was born on February 25, 1892, to Oliver Hayes Shields (1865-1905) and Jennette Cockrill (1869-1899). Shields graduated from the University of Kentucky Law School and completed her postgraduate work at the Cumberland School of Law in Tennessee On January 28, 1918, Shields became the first female to be called to the Arkansas Bar Association. She married attorney Thomas Cal (T.C.) Jobe (1864-1929) and stopped practicing law when the couple moved to Washington whereupon Jobe was elected to the U.S. Senate. She died on January 23, 1983.

See also 
 List of first women lawyers and judges in Arkansas

References 

Arkansas lawyers
1892 births
1983 deaths
20th-century American women lawyers
20th-century American lawyers